Climbing mouse may refer to members of the following genera of rodents:
Dendromus, from Africa;
Dendroprionomys (Velvet African Climbing Mouse), from the Republic of the Congo;
Irenomys (Chilean Climbing Mouse), from southwestern South America;
Rhipidomys, from South America;
Vandeleuria, from southern and southeastern Asia;
Vernaya (Vernay's Climbing Mouse), from southern China and northern Myanmar.